Miguel Hernández (1910–1942) was a Spanish poet and playwright.

Miguel Hernández or Miguel Hernandez is also the name of:

Politicians
 Miguel Hernández Agosto (1927–2016), Puerto Rican politician
 Miguel Luna Hernández (1953–2017), Mexican Party of the Democratic Revolution politician
 Miguel Gutiérrez Hernández (born 1963), Mexican National Action Party politician

Sportspeople
 Miguel Hernández (footballer, born 1970), Spanish football manager and former centre-back
 Miguel Hernandez (boxer) (born 1974), American boxer
 Miguel Javid Hernández (born 1976), Mexican football player and manager
 Miguel Hernández (footballer, born 1984), Chilean football midfielder

See also 
 Miguel Hernández (Madrid Metro)